Soul Limbo is the seventh studio album by the American R&B band Booker T. & the M.G.'s, released in 1968 on Stax Records. The album was the first Stax LP issued after the label severed its ties with former distributor Atlantic Records in 1968.

The title track is perhaps best known in the UK as the theme tune for BBC Television's cricket coverage and later for Test Match Special. It features a marimba solo by Terry Manning and cowbell by Isaac Hayes. The song was later covered by the English punk band Snuff. It is a contrafact of La Bamba.

The album also features the group's hit version of the title theme from the film Hang 'Em High.

Track listing
Side one
"Be Young, Be Foolish, Be Happy" (J.R. Cobb, Ray Whitley)
"La-La (Means I Love You)" (Thom Bell, William Hart)
"Hang 'Em High" (Dominic Frontiere)
"Willow Weep for Me" (Ann Ronell)
"Over Easy" (Booker T. & the M.G.'s)
"Soul Limbo" (Booker T. & the M.G.'s)

Side two
"Eleanor Rigby" (John Lennon, Paul McCartney)
"Heads or Tails" (Booker T. & the M.G.'s)
"(Sweet Sweet Baby) Since You've Been Gone" (Aretha Franklin, Teddy White)
"Born Under a Bad Sign" (William Bell, Booker T. Jones)
"Foxy Lady" (Jimi Hendrix)

Personnel
Booker T. & the M.G.s
 Booker T. Jones - Hammond organ, clavinet, piano, guitar
 Steve Cropper - guitar
 Donald Dunn - bass guitar
 Al Jackson Jr. - drums, percussion
with:
 Terry Manning - marimba on "Soul Limbo"
 Isaac Hayes - cowbell on "Soul Limbo"

References

Booker T. & the M.G.'s albums
1968 albums
Stax Records albums
Albums produced by Al Jackson Jr.
Albums produced by Donald "Duck" Dunn
Albums produced by Steve Cropper
Albums produced by Booker T. Jones
Sports television theme songs